Seatoun, an eastern suburb of Wellington, the capital city of New Zealand, lies on the east coast of the Miramar Peninsula, close to the entrance to Wellington Harbour (Port Nicholson), some seven kilometres southeast of the CBD. The suburb sits on an exposed promontory close to Barrett Reef, a dangerous area of rocky shallows upon which many ships have foundered, most notably the inter-island ferry  in 1968.

Europeans first settled the suburb in 1889. The name Seatoun (originally Seatown) comes from a locality in Forfarshire, Scotland linked with the family history of Coutts Crawford, the suburb's founder.

Demographics 

Seatoun had a population of 2,319 at the 2018 New Zealand census, an increase of 84 people (3.8%) since the 2013 census, and an increase of 180 people (8.4%) since the 2006 census. There were 819 households. There were 1,161 males and 1,158 females, giving a sex ratio of 1.0 males per female. The median age was 43.9 years (compared with 37.4 years nationally), with 495 people (21.3%) aged under 15 years, 321 (13.8%) aged 15 to 29, 1,197 (51.6%) aged 30 to 64, and 306 (13.2%) aged 65 or older.

Ethnicities were 86.7% European/Pākehā, 6.2% Māori, 1.2% Pacific peoples, 10.7% Asian, and 2.6% other ethnicities (totals add to more than 100% since people could identify with multiple ethnicities).

The proportion of people born overseas was 30.0%, compared with 27.1% nationally.

Although some people objected to giving their religion, 54.7% had no religion, 34.8% were Christian, 2.3% were Hindu, 0.5% were Muslim, 0.6% were Buddhist and 1.9% had other religions.

Of those at least 15 years old, 906 (49.7%) people had a bachelor or higher degree, and 126 (6.9%) people had no formal qualifications. The median income was $54,300, compared with $31,800 nationally. The employment status of those at least 15 was that 963 (52.8%) people were employed full-time, 309 (16.9%) were part-time, and 60 (3.3%) were unemployed.

Education

Seatoun School

The school was founded in 1916. It relocated to a new facility on the old Fort Dorset New Zealand Army base in 2002, near the entrance to the Wellington Harbour.

Other schools

Te Kura Kaupapa Māori o Nga Mokopuna is a co-educational state Māori language immersion school for Year 1 to 13 students, with a roll of 82.

References

Suburbs of Wellington City
Populated places around the Wellington Harbour